Molybdopterin-synthase adenylyltransferase (MoeB, adenylyltransferase and sulfurtransferase MOCS3) is an enzyme with systematic name ATP:molybdopterin-synthase adenylyltransferase. This enzyme catalyses the following chemical reaction

 ATP + [molybdopterin-synthase sulfur-carrier protein]-Gly-Gly  diphosphate + [molybdopterin-synthase sulfur-carrier protein]-Gly-Gly-AMP

This enzyme adenylates the C-terminus of the small subunit of the molybdopterin synthase.

References

External links 
 

EC 2.7.7